Fleetwood High School is a coeducational secondary school located in Fleetwood in the English county of Lancashire.

The school was founded in 1977 as a comprehensive non-denominational school, a successor to Fleetwood Grammar School (1921–77) and Bailey School. It was renamed Fleetwood Sports College in 2005 when the school was given specialist school status in sport, but reverted to its original name in September 2010. Today it is a foundation school administered by Lancashire County Council and the Fleetwood Education Trust.

Fleetwood High School admits pupils from the Fylde Coast, predominantly Fleetwood, Thornton and Cleveleys. Main feeder primary schools include Charles Saer Primary School, Chaucer Primary School, Flakefleet Primary School, Larkholme Primary School and Shakespeare Primary School. Fleetwood High School offers GCSEs and BTECs as programmes of study for pupils. The school also offers some vocational courses in conjunction with Blackpool and The Fylde College.

References

External links
Fleetwood High School official website

Secondary schools in Lancashire
Educational institutions established in 1977
1977 establishments in England
Schools in the Borough of Wyre
Buildings and structures in Fleetwood
Foundation schools in Lancashire